is a 1987 Japanese film directed by Kon Ichikawa. It is based on The Tale of the Bamboo Cutter, a 10th-century Japanese fairy tale about a girl from the Moon who is discovered as a baby inside the stalk of a glowing bamboo plant.

Plot
One day bamboo cutter Taketori-no-Miyatsuko (Toshiro Mifune) discovers a baby girl while he is out in the forest, visiting his daughter's grave. Not wanting to leave the infant to die and because of her resemblance to his dead daughter, he takes the child home with him- only to discover that the child grows at an extraordinarily fast rate. Incredibly beautiful, the now grown child Kaya (Yasuko Sawaguchi) attracts the attention of everyone around her, including the land's Emperor. Unwilling to accept their advances, Kaya gives the men a list of increasingly difficult tasks. By the film's end Kaya returns to outer-space by way of a space ship.

Cast
 Toshiro Mifune as Taketori-no-Miyatsuko
 Yasuko Sawaguchi as Kaya, the Princess Kaguya
 Ayako Wakao as Tayoshime
 Koji Ishizaka as Mikado
 Kiichi Nakai as Otomo-no-Dainagon or Minister of the Military
 Megumi Odaka as Akeno
 Katsuo Nakamura as Lise
 Takeshi Katō as Fujiwara-no-Okuni
 Kyōko Kishida as Kougo
 Jun Hamamura as Sakanoue-no-Dajo-Daijin
 Koasa Shunpitei as Kuramochi-no-Miko or Minister of Culture
 Takatoshi Takeda as Abe-no-Udaijin or Minister of Finance
 Shirō Itō as Sojo-no-Doson
 Fujio Tokita as Shonin-no-Uda
 Hirokazu Yamaguchi as Metal Carver
 Gen Idemitsu as Mura-no-Choja
 Michiyo Yokoyama as Lise's Wife
 Hirokazu Inoue as Ono-no-Fusamori
 Miho Nakano as Kaya

Background
The film was released as Toho's 55th Anniversary Film in 1987. Ichikawa noted that he had wanted to make this film for many years, and said his intention was to make it a "film of pure diversion". The film was selected as the opening film of the Tokyo International Film Festival, where it was not well received by critics. Toho promoted the film heavily, and it had the second highest theatrical returns of any film that  year, but its financial performance did not equal that of Ichikawa's 1985 release Harp of Burma.

Reception

Awards and nominations
 1988, won Japanese Academy Awards Newcomer of the Year for Megumi Odaka
 1988, won Japanese Academy Awards Best Art Direction for Shinobu Muraki
 1988, won Japanese Academy Awards Special Award for Teruyoshi Nakano, Kenichi Eguchi, Yasuyuki Inoue, Takeshi Miyanishi, Kazunobu Sanpei, Eiichi Asada, Kohei Mikami, and Hiroshi Shirakawa
 1988, nominated Japanese Academy Awards Best Film
 1988, nominated Japanese Academy Awards Best Director for Kon Ichikawa
 1988, nominated Japanese Academy Awards Best Cinematography for Setsuo Kobayashi
 1988, nominated Japanese Academy Awards Best Editing for Chizuko Osada
 1988, nominated Japanese Academy Awards Best Lighting for Kazuo Shimomura
 1988, nominated Japanese Academy Awards Best Music Score for Kensaku Tanikawa
 1988, nominated Japanese Academy Awards Best Sound for Teiichi Saito and Tetsuya Ohashi
 1988, nominated Japanese Academy Awards Best Supporting Actor for Toshiro Mifune

See also 
 From the Towers of the Moon, an opera inspired by the film
 The Tale of the Princess Kaguya, a 2013 anime film by Studio Ghibli also directly retelling the folk tale

References

External links
 
 
 

1987 films
1980s science fiction films
1987 fantasy films
Japanese science fiction films
Japanese fantasy films
1980s Japanese-language films
Films directed by Kon Ichikawa
Films based on fairy tales
Films with screenplays by Kon Ichikawa
Films dubbed by Frontier Enterprises
Moon in film
1980s Japanese films